Paul Palango (born 1950) is a Canadian author and investigative journalist. Palango worked as a journalist and editor for The Hamilton Spectator and The Globe and Mail. He has written four non-fiction books about policing in Canada, including 22 Murders.

Early life 
Palango was born in 1950 in Ontario, Canada.

Career 
In the 1970s he worked for the The Hamilton Spectator before moving to The Globe and Mail in 1977 and remaining there until 1990 when he retired as an editor. Palango is noted for his reporting on authority figures including the Canadian police, Canadian Security Intelligence Service, the Canadian media, and business leaders. In 2000, he opened a glass art business in Lunenburg, Nova Scotia.

He returned to writing, publishing 22 Murders in 2022, his critical account of the Royal Canadian Mounted Police response to the 2020 Nova Scotia attacks. The book was the second on the Toronto Star’s list of bestselling non-fiction in Canada in April 2022.

The Georgia Straight editor, Charlie Smith, described Palango as "one of Canada's last remaining investigative reporters." in August 2022.

Books 

 Above the Law, 1994, McClelland & Stewart, 
 The Last Guardians: The Crisis in the RCMP - and Canada, 1998, McClelland & Stewart, 
 Dispersing the Fog: Inside the Secret World of Ottawa and the RCMP, 2008, Key Porter Books, 
 22 Murders, 2022, Random House Canada,

Personal life 
Palango lives in Nova Scotia.

References 

1950 births
20th-century Canadian journalists
21st-century Canadian journalists
21st-century Canadian artists
Canadian glass artists
Canadian newspaper editors
21st-century Canadian non-fiction writers
20th-century Canadian non-fiction writers
Living people
Canadian investigative journalists